The Cumberland YMCA building is a three-story wedge-shaped brick structure with a partially raised basement, built in 1925 in the Classical Revival style, located in Cumberland, Maryland, United States.  It is an excellent example of institutional architecture of its time. At the time of its construction, it offered the only indoor swimming pool in the area.

The building was listed on the National Register of Historic Places in 1997.

See also 
 Downtown Cumberland Historic District

References

External links 
, including photo in 2002, at Maryland Historical Trust
 Cumberland YMCA

Downtown Cumberland, Maryland
Buildings and structures in Cumberland, Maryland
Organizations based in Cumberland, MD-WV-PA
Clubhouses on the National Register of Historic Places in Maryland
Neoclassical architecture in Maryland
Buildings and structures completed in 1925
YMCA buildings in the United States
Clubhouses in Maryland
National Register of Historic Places in Allegany County, Maryland